Éditions Robert Laffont is a book publishing company in France founded in 1941 by Robert Laffont. Its publications are distributed in almost all francophone countries, but mainly in France, Canada and in Belgium.

It is considered one of the most important French publishing houses. Imprints belonging to Éditions Robert Laffont include éditions Julliard, les Seghers, Foreign Rights and NiL Éditions. In 1990, Éditions Robert Laffont was acquired by the French publishing group Groupe de La Cité. It is now part of Editis.

Éditions Robert Laffont published the Quid encyclopedia from 1975 to 2007, but announced that the 2008 edition of the encyclopedia would not be published after annual sales had fallen from a high of 400,000 to less than 100,000, apparently because of competition from online information sources such as Wikipedia.

Selected publications

Book series
 Ailleurs et Demain
 Arizona
 Best Sellers
 Bouquins
 Libertés
 Libertés 2000 
 Pavillons
 Pavillons Poche
 Plein Vent
 Vécu

References

External links
Éditions Robert Laffont – Official site

Book publishing companies of France
French dictionaries
French speculative fiction publishers
Publishing companies established in 1941
Educational book publishing companies
1941 establishments in France